Hugh McFadden may refer to:

 Hugh McFadden (poet), Irish poet and journalist
 Hugh McFadden (Gaelic footballer), Irish Gaelic footballer

See also
 Hugh McFadyen, lawyer and politician in Manitoba, Canada